The 1977 edition of the Campeonato Carioca kicked off on March 26, 1977 and ended on September 28, 1977. It was organized by FCF (Federação Carioca de Futebol, or Carioca Football Federation). Fifteen teams contested this edition. Vasco da Gama won the title for the 14th time. no teams were relegated.

System
The tournament would be divided in three stages:
 Taça Guanabara: The fifteen teams all played in a single round-robin format against each other. The champions qualified to the Finals.
 Taça Manoel do Nascimento Vargas Netto: The fifteen teams all played in a single round-robin format against each other. The champions qualified to the Finals.
 Finals: Would be disputed by the two stage winners; in case the same team won both stages, the Finals wouldn't be held.

Championship

Taça Guanabara

Taça Manoel do Nascimento Vargas Netto

Playoffs

Aggregate table

Top Scorer

References

Campeonato Carioca seasons
Carioca